During the 1978–79 Scottish football season, Celtic competed in the Scottish Premier Division.

Competitions

Scottish Premier Division

League table

Matches

Scottish Cup

Scottish League Cup

Anglo-Scottish Cup

Glasgow Cup

Club staff

Transfers

References

Scottish football championship-winning seasons
Celtic F.C. seasons
Celtic